Karel Janák (born 24 September 1970) is a Czech director. His 2004 film Snowboarďáci was recognised at the 2004 Czech Lion Awards as the most visited film of the year.

Selected filmography
Snowboarďáci (2004)
Ro(c)k podvraťáků (2006)
Rafťáci (2006)
Little Knights Tale (Ať žijí rytíři!, 2009)
10 Rules (2014)
Princess and the scribe (Princezna a písař, 2014, television film)

References

External links

1970 births
Living people
Czech screenwriters
Male screenwriters
Film directors from Prague